Enian Qaghan (遏捻可汗) was the last effective ruler (khagan) of the Uyghur Khaganate.

Life 
He was a younger brother of Wujie Qaghan and succeeded him in 846. He had 5000 Uyghur followers under his command and lived among Tatabi and depended on their chieftain Shi Shelang (石捨朗) for support. However this support ended when Zhang Zhongwu invaded Xi domains in summer of 847. and after Zhang's victory over the Xi he could no longer do so, and so was forced to flee further to the Shiwei. In 848, apparently to try to appease Tang, Qaghan sent an emissary to pay homage to Emperor Xuānzong. When the emissary was returning to qaghan through You Prefecture, however, Zhang ordered him to kill Qaghan once he arrived back at Uyghur headquarters. When Enian heard this, he fled westward with his wife, son and 12 bodyguards, leaving his people with the Shiwei. His subsequent fate is unknown.

References 

9th-century monarchs in Asia
9th-century Turkic people
Ädiz clan